Stod is a town in Plzeň-South District in the Plzeň Region of the Czech Republic. It has about 3,500 inhabitants.

Administrative parts

The village of Lelov is an administrative part of Stod.

Geography
It lies on the border between the Plasy Uplands and Švihov Highlands. The town is situated at the confluence of the Radbuza and Merklínka rivers.

History
The first written mention of Stod is from 1235, when King Wenceslaus I of Bohemia left the village to the Chotěšov Abbey. In 1315, John of Bohemia promoted the village to a market town. By the period of Charles IV in 1363, the town acquired more privileges, such as a judiciary, the right to use a town seal, and to keep the town's books. In 1544 the town was granted the privilege of establishing a malt-house and a brewery. By 1547 there was a post office and in 1550 Ferdinand I allowed the town to stage an annual fair.

The market town was set back by the turmoil of the Thirty Years' War. By 1654, only about 230 residents remained in Stod. Consequently tracts of land were distributed to German families from Bavaria to repopulate the region, which led to Germanization of Stod. By 1850, Stod had grown to approximately 1,500 residents and was promoted to a town.

In 1863, a group of 83 people from Stod, led by the former military officer Martin Krippner, left to settle Puhoi in New Zealand.

In 1938, the town was annexed by Nazi Germany and administered as part of Reichsgau Sudetenland. After World War II, most of the German population was expelled.

Demographics

Sights

The main landmark of Stod is the Church of Saint Mary Magdalene. It was built in the Neoclassical style on the site of an older church in 1841–1843.

Near the church is the Chapel of Saint John of Nepomuk. It is a baroque chapel from the early 18th century, which belonged to a now non-existent hospital.

Notable people
Arthur Salz (1881–1963), German sociologist and economist
Ilona Uhlíková-Voštová (born 1954), table tennis player
Pavel Soukup (born 1971), athlete

References

External links

Cities and towns in the Czech Republic
Populated places in Plzeň-South District